Pimelea micrantha, commonly known as silky rice-flower is a species of flowering plant in the family Thymelaeaceae and is endemic to southern Australia. It is a much-branched undershrub with narrowly elliptic to lance-shaped leaves and compact clusters or heads of densely hairy, creamy white flowers.

Description
Flowering mainly occurs from August to December and the fruit contains a pear-shaped nut.

Taxonomy
Pimelea micrantha was first formally described in 1854 by Carl Meissner in the journal Linnaea from an unpublished description by Ferdinand von Mueller, of specimens collected by Hans Hermann Behr. The specific epithet (micrantha) means "small-flowered".

Distribution and habitat
Silky rice-flower grows in sandy or clayey soil, often in rocky areas south from Manilla in inland New South Wales, in scattered populations in northern Victoria and southern Western Australia, and on Flinders Island and the Midlands of Tasmania.

References

micrantha
Flora of New South Wales
Flora of South Australia
Flora of Tasmania
Flora of Victoria (Australia)
Rosids of Western Australia
Malvales of Australia
Plants described in 1854
Taxa named by Carl Meissner